Bonnie Lauer (born February 20, 1951) is an American professional golfer, currently retired from the LPGA Tour.

Lauer graduated cum laude in 1973 from Michigan State University, where she won the national individual intercollegiate golf championship that same year.

Lauer turned professional in 1975. In 1976, she won the LPGA Rookie of the Year award.

Lauer had individual victories in both 1977 and 1985. She had her best finish in a major championship at  the 1981 U.S. Women's Open where she finished T4 after being tied for the lead after 36 holes.

Lauer was the President of the LPGA in 1988.

Professional wins

LPGA Tour wins (2)

LPGA Tour playoff record (0–1)

Team appearances
Amateur
Curtis Cup (representing the United States): 1974 (winners)

References

External links

American female golfers
Michigan State Spartans women's golfers
LPGA Tour golfers
1951 births
Living people